Qualification for men's artistic gymnastics competitions at the 2020 Summer Olympics was held at the Ariake Gymnastics Centre on 24 July 2021. The results of the qualification determined the qualifiers to the finals: 8 teams in the team final, 24 gymnasts in the all-around final, and 8 gymnasts in each of six apparatus finals. The competition was divided into three subdivisions.

Subdivisions

Gymnasts from nations taking part in the team all-around event were grouped together while the remaining gymnasts were grouped into one of six mixed groups. The groups were divided into the three subdivisions after a draw held by the Fédération Internationale de Gymnastique. The groups rotated through each of the six apparatuses together.
 ind: Individual gymnast from NOC with a qualified team.

Results

Team

Individual all-around

Floor

Pommel horse

Rings

Vault

Parallel bars

Horizontal bar

Notes

References 

Men's artistic qualification
2020
2021 in gymnastics
Men's events at the 2020 Summer Olympics